Hornsey  is a district of north London, England in the London Borough of Haringey. It adjoins green spaces Queen's Wood and Alexandra Park to the north. Known locally as Hornsey Village (to avoid confusion with the original borough of Hornsey) it is London's oldest recorded village, first recorded in 1202, according to the Place Names of Middlesex.

Locale
Hornsey is relatively old, being originally a village that grew up along Hornsey High Street, at the eastern end of which is the churchyard and tower of the former St Mary's parish church, which was first mentioned in 1291. At the western end is Priory Park. This was the administrative centre of the historically broad parish.

North of Hornsey High Street, and immediately to its south, some of the area is public sector housing, surrounded by the late Victorian terraces developed by builders such as John Farrer. Between the western end of the High Street and the bottom of Muswell Hill, the character of the area changes; most being part of the Warner Estate built up with large late Victorian houses. To the south west of the High Street is Priory Park.

The High Street has a variety of shops, restaurants and pubs, the oldest being the Three Compasses. The eastern section retains strips of grassed areas. 

The 13th-century St Mary's Tower is all that remains of St Mary's Church. The church was demolished in Victorian times and a grey stone church was built on the corner of Church Lane and Hornsey High Street. The tower was retained as there were not enough funds raised for a new bell tower. However, in the late 60s the Victorian church was demolished and St Mary's school was built on the site. 

The 500-year-old Tower is managed by the charity Friends of Hornsey Church Tower (FoHCT), and is now used for open-air live performances. The internal space, known as The Intimate Space, claims to be London's smallest performance space. It has become one of the four key venues of the Crouch End Festival that now runs an annual two-day music festival, The Tower Music Festival. Hornsey Parish Church holds open-air services there every Sunday.

Hornsey also has a Bowling Club which is situated on land owned by the London Diocesan Fund, part of the Diocese of London. The London Diocesan Fund had expressed an interest in building new homes on the site of the Bowling Club in 2015.

Geography

There are various views as to the location of Hornsey's current boundaries. The northern and eastern boundaries are relatively uncontentious. Most definitions seem to recognise those as being provided by Alexandra Park and the Great Northern Railway respectively. The southern and western boundaries are less clear cut. A recent version of those boundaries was provided by popular local opinion as expressed in the residents' survey undertaken as part of the application for the Crouch End Neighbourhood Forum. It offers a contemporary view of where local residents see the boundary between Hornsey and Crouch End and so defines the southern and western boundaries. The area defined is almost identical to that presented by one individual on a personal Google Map. Both closely resemble the post-19th century Anglican parish and refer to former methods of property reference such as the layout of building schemes (developers' estates).

History

The name Hornsey has its origin in the Saxon period and is derived from the name of a Saxon chieftain called Haering. Haering's Hege meant Haering's enclosure. The earliest written form of the name was recorded as Harenhg’ in about 1195. Its development thereafter gave rise to the modern-day names of Harringay (the district of London), the London Borough of Haringey and Hornsey. The church was first mentioned in 1291. Hornsey Village developed along what is now Hornsey High Street, and in the seventeenth century it was bisected by the New River that crossed the village in three places: first at the end of Nightingale Lane, secondly from behind the Three Compasses and lastly, as it does now, at the bottom of Tottenham Lane. The village grew dramatically after about 1860 and eventually merged with the separate settlement at Crouch End (first mentioned in 1465), to form an urban area in the middle of the parish.

Hornsey was a much larger original ancient parish than today's electoral ward of the same name. These entities are smaller than the Municipal Borough of Hornsey which co-governed the area with Middlesex County Council from 1889 until 1965, since when the name refers, as a minimum, to the London neighbourhood with a high street at its traditional heart to the west of Hornsey railway station. Its parish ranked sixth in size, of more than forty in Ossulstone, the largest hundred in Middlesex and was a scattered semi-rural community of 2,716 people in 1801. By 1901 the population had risen about eightfold in forty years, reaching 87,626, by which time new localities/districts, mainly Crouch End and Muswell Hill, were popularly becoming considered distinct from Hornsey. The N8 postcode district, the current form of Hornsey ward as devised from time-to-time for equal representation (electorate) across wards of the Borough, and the choice of other railway and tube stations towards, on these definitions, outer parts create conflicting definitions of Hornsey and it is unclear whether since 1965 the term is distinct from Hornsey Village, a term unrecognised by some residents.

The old parish used to have two small detached parts immediately beyond and within Stoke Newington Parish. In the 1840s the parish had 5,937 residents, slightly reduced by the loss of Finsbury Park but comprised  taking in besides its own village, the established hamlets of Muswell Hill, Crouch End, Stroud Green, and part of Highgate.

Much of Hornsey was built up in Edwardian times, but the tower of the original parish church still stands in its ancient graveyard in Hornsey High Street, at the centre of the old village. Other notable places are the former Hornsey Town Hall in Crouch End, and Highpoint and Cromwell House in Highgate.

Opened in 1932, it had 33,000 users a year in the 1950s. A small group of residents wished Haringey Council to purchase the site and install arts and crafts studios, with a gallery, primarily for local artists.

For 1978–2002 in the borough, having in its initial 13 years no wards mentioning Hornsey, three wards bearing the name existed and so popularised it among bordering, competing areas with newer names, strongly reflecting their historic, shared identity:
Hornsey Central
Hornsey Vale
South Hornsey

Economic development

In 1870 the first shop of what would become the David Greig grocery chain, once a rival to Sainsbury's, was opened in 32 Hornsey High Street by Greig's mother.

In 1951 the first Lotus Cars factory was established in stables behind the Railway Hotel (now No5 Dining) on Tottenham Lane. The company was formed as Lotus Engineering Ltd by Colin Chapman and Colin Dare, both engineering graduates of University College, London. The Railway Hotel pub was owned by Chapman's father. In its early days Lotus sold cars aimed at private racers and trialists. Its early road cars could be bought as kits, in order to save on purchase tax. Adjacent to the pub was the first Lotus showroom (now part of Jewson's) where there is now a memorial plaque to Colin Chapman erected by Club Lotus. Recently an application to demolish the building, listed by Haringey Council as an "historic building of interest", was turned down following a public campaign by local resident Chris Arnold, son of the former Lotus Sales Director Graham Arnold. It was briefly a plumbing shop but is now empty. Suggestions have been made to turn it into a Colin Chapman museum or a Colin Chapman innovation centre for young people. Lotus moved to Cheshunt in 1959, and to Hethel in Norfolk in 1966.

Established in 1964, Hornsey Co-operative Credit Union was Britain's oldest credit union, until it merged with London Capital Credit Union in 2013.

Since 2000 Hornsey's residential developments have been architecturally diverse and overall accommodative of a diverse range of the local community.  This has included estates of more than 50 homes with a proportion available under social housing and affordable housing schemes.

A major maintenance depot for the new electric trains running from Finsbury Park to Brighton has been constructed beside the main line.

The Hornsey Water Treatment Works were developed alongside the New River, the water supply system constructed in the 17th century that brings water from Hertfordshire to London. The brick buildings associated with the works were the last constructed by the New River Company before the Metropolitan Water Board took over in 1904. They are now run by Thames Water and still supply some of London's water.

Rail transport

Local commuter and regional services are provided from Hornsey railway station by Great Northern into Central London ending in Moorgate and towards Hertfordshire. Turnpike Lane tube station on the Piccadilly Line is the nearest Underground station.

Education

Secondary schools serving the area include Greig City Academy, Hornsey School for Girls and Highgate Wood Secondary School.
Primary schools within Hornsey include Campsbourne Primary School and St Mary's Primary School.

In literature

In Jonathan Coe's 1987 debut novel The Accidental Woman, the protagonist Maria shares a flat in Hornsey with two other women for several years.

Notable residents
See :Category:People from Hornsey

Transport and locale

Nearest places
Crouch End
Alexandra Palace
Muswell Hill
Wood Green
Harringay
Finsbury Park
Stroud Green

Nearest stations
 Hornsey
 Harringay
 Turnpike Lane

References

External links

 Vision of Britain entry for Hornsey
 Local community website for all of N8, i.e. Crouch End and Hornsey
 Hornsey Historical Society
 The Colin Chapman Museum and Education Centre - includes a history of Lotus in Hornsey.

 
Districts of the London Borough of Haringey
Areas of London
Places formerly in Middlesex